Susner is a town and a nagar panchayat and Sub division in Agar Malwa district in the Indian state of Madhya Pradesh.

Geography
It has an average elevation of 502 metres (1,646 feet).

Demographics
 India census, Susner had a population of 16,432	. Males constitute 52% of the population and females 48%. Susner has an average literacy rate of 72%, higher than the national average of 59.5%: male literacy is 79%, and female literacy is 64%. In Susner, 16% of the population is under 6 years of age.

References

Cities and towns in Agar Malwa district